Vale is an unincorporated community in Lincoln County, North Carolina, United States. Parts of Vale extend to western Catawba County It lies at an elevation of 1028 feet (283 m). The area of Vale is nearly all rural, with  farming the predominant industry.

By car, Vale is about 10 minutes from Cherryville, 15 minutes from Lincolnton, 30 minutes from Hickory and Morganton, and 55 minutes from Charlotte. It is one hour from the Appalachian mountains and around four hours from the coast.

Vale has a post office. Its ZIP code is 28168.

Vale is home to the annual Cat Square Christmas Parade, started in 1974, known as the "Best Little Christmas Parade in the Country". The parade festivities included electing the Mayor of Cat Square. The mayor is strictly a figurehead, with his or her only duty being to ride in the parade.

Reinhardt-Craig House, Kiln and Pottery Shop was listed on the National Register of Historic Places in 2008.

Vale was the destination of 50 African American families during the Great Migration. Most migrated from Half Acre Township in Putnam County, Georgia. They established three migration churches and three black elementary schools. They moved out of Vale by 1978 and were replaced by Mexican laborers. 

Naïve painter Minnie Reinhardt grew up in Vale.

References

  

Unincorporated communities in Lincoln County, North Carolina
Unincorporated communities in North Carolina